Sakina Mamedova (born 13 December 1985) is a Uzbekistani sports shooter. She competed in the Women's 10 metre air rifle event at the 2012 Summer Olympics. She also competed in the Women's 50 metre rifle three positions event.

References

1985 births
Living people
Uzbekistani female sport shooters
Olympic shooters of Uzbekistan
Shooters at the 2012 Summer Olympics
Sportspeople from Tashkent
Asian Games medalists in shooting
Shooters at the 2006 Asian Games
Shooters at the 2010 Asian Games
Shooters at the 2014 Asian Games
Asian Games bronze medalists for Uzbekistan
Medalists at the 2014 Asian Games
Shooters at the 2018 Asian Games
21st-century Uzbekistani women